is a Japanese politician serving in the House of Representatives in the Diet (national legislature) as a member of the Liberal Democratic Party. A native of Kōnosu, Saitama he attended Nippon Sport Science University as an undergraduate and Senshu University as a graduate student. He was elected to the Diet for the first time in 2005 after unsuccessfully running for mayor of his hometown Kōnosu in 2001.

References

External links 
  in Japanese.

Members of the House of Representatives (Japan)
Koizumi Children
Nippon Sport Science University alumni
Politicians from Saitama Prefecture
Living people
1969 births
Liberal Democratic Party (Japan) politicians